Cirrhochrista metisalis is a moth in the family Crambidae. It was described by Viette in 1961. It is found in Madagascar.

References

Moths described in 1961
Spilomelinae
Moths of Madagascar